Julia Ling, born Xiao Wei Lin, is an American actress. Her television work includes recurring roles on NBC series such as ER, Studio 60 on the Sunset Strip, and as a series regular on Chuck.

Early life and education
Ling was born in Temple City, California. Her grandparents originally from China, fled to Cambodia during the Second Sino-Japanese War. Ling's parents grew up in Cambodia, and later fled to the United States during the Cambodian genocide, shortly before her birth.

At age 6, Ling won the "Best Storyteller Award" by Chinese World News for storytelling.  Ling's artwork was featured on the front page of Pasadena Star News and in magazines and festivals. By age 9, Ling was performing award-winning solo dances throughout California, and her umbrella dance had aired on national television.

At Temple City High School, as a scholar athlete, she competed in dance, tennis and swimming.

At UCLA, Ling majored in biomedical chemical engineering.  She was Treasurer of the Chemical Engineering Society, Vice President of the Engineering Society of UCLA, and honorary member of the Society of Women Engineers.

Career
Ling has starred in over 20 independent films and had numerous TV roles. She made her TV debut in 2003 on Buffy the Vampire Slayer, and later starred in the recurring role of Kim Tao on NBC's Studio 60 on the Sunset Strip. She played Anna Wu on NBC's Chuck for 3 seasons. Her other major guest and recurring roles on television include stints on House, ER, Grey's Anatomy, The O.C. and The Deep End.

In 2007, Ling competed in the martial arts competition Jackie Chan Disciples. She was selected as a "Top Four Finalist" representing the U.S. at the International Finalists tournament in China. Her performance also won her the "Best Acting Award". She was unable to compete in China because of her role on Chuck.

In 2008, Ling voiced and filmed her first live action series for the video game Command and Conquer: Red Alert 3.

In 2020, Ling appeared as a guest on the Studio 60 on the Sunset Strip marathon fundraiser episode of The George Lucas Talk Show.

Filmography
All credits are from IMDb.

Film

Television

Video games

References

External links
 
 
 
 

American actresses of Chinese descent
American film actresses
American television actresses
American video game actresses
Living people
21st-century American actresses
People from Temple City, California
1983 births
University of California, Los Angeles alumni
Actresses from California